Andréanne Poulin (born April 26, 1995) is a Canadian former competitive ice dancer. With partner Marc-André Servant, she is the 2015 Skate Canada Autumn Classic silver medalist and 2012 Canadian national junior champion.

Poulin began skating at age three and ice dancing at eight. Poulin and Servant were coached for a number of years by Shawn Winter and Elise Hamel at the Deux-Rives Figure Skating Club in Pierrefonds, Quebec. In 2015, they moved to train with Carol Lane, Juris Razgulajevs, and Jon Lane at the Scarboro FSC in Ontario. The duo retired from competition on August 4, 2016.

Programs 
(with Servant)

Competitive highlights 
CS: Challenger Series; JGP: Junior Grand Prix

With Servant

References

External links 

 

Canadian female ice dancers
1995 births
Living people
People from L'Île-Bizard–Sainte-Geneviève
Figure skaters from Montreal